Goulding's Trading Post, also called Goulding's Lodge, is a historic general store, motel, and museum in southern Utah, United States, just outside of Monument Valley. It was constructed in 1928, seven years after Harry Goulding purchased 640 acres of land in the area. Shortly after Monument Valley became a popular tourist attraction, it was renamed and remodeled to house Goulding's Lodge. The lodge originally served as a trading post and home for the Gouldings.

During the Great Depression, while director John Ford was looking for a site to film his 1939 movie Stagecoach, Goulding went to work capturing photos of Monument Valley to send to Ford, who ended up shooting not only Stagecoach there but several other successful Western films. The films helped to popularize the area, and Goulding, realizing the potential value of tourism, established lodging and other services that could bring additional attention and profit.

Today, the former trading post serves as a motel/museum for tourists and travelers looking to catch a glimpse of the famous valley, and has been converted into what is currently the Goulding Lodge. Its history, isolation, and proximity to Monument Valley Navajo Tribal Park have made it a popular roadside attraction for travelers. The trading post was added to the National Register of Historic Places on October 20, 1980.

Monuments

See also

 National Register of Historic Places listings in San Juan County, Utah

References

External links

 

Buildings and structures in San Juan County, Utah
Commercial buildings on the National Register of Historic Places in Utah
History museums in Utah
Hotel buildings on the National Register of Historic Places in Utah
Native American museums in Utah
Museums in San Juan County, Utah
Trading posts in the United States
1923 establishments in Utah